The  was a cutter class vessel owned and operated by the Sea Shepherd Conservation Society since December 2017. She is being used in their direct action campaigns against illegal fisheries activities.

Overview
The ship is an  built by Bollinger Shipyards, Lockport, Louisiana and first launched in 1991 as the U.S. Coast Guard cutter Bainbridge Island. After 22 years of service, it was retired in a ceremony in New Jersey on 17 March 2014.

The vessel was purchased and was donated to Sea Shepherd Conservation Society by medtech entrepreneur Chris Sharp, and it was presented at a press conference on 11 December 2017 in Miami, Florida. The vessel was renamed MV Sharpie, named after its donor.

Incidents
In January 2019, a "mob of over 50 skiffs" threw Molotov cocktails and rocks burning the MV Sharpie's Hull and breaking windows.

In February 2020, the MV Sharpie was fired upon while on "routine" patrol of the Vaquita Refuge in the Gulf of California.

See also
 Neptune's Navy, Sea Shepherd vessels
 Sea Shepherd Conservation Society operations

References

Sea Shepherd Conservation Society ships
2017 ships
Ships built in Lockport, Louisiana
Island-class patrol boats